Rappelkiste (1973–1984) was a progressive pedagogic television series for children in Germany. Regarding its general conception and idea, it is very roughly comparable to Sesame Street in the English-speaking world. It was produced by ZDF and originally broadcast every Sunday on 2 pm. For its 1973–74 season, it was awarded the Adolf-Grimme-Preis.

See also
List of German television series

External links
 

German children's television series
1973 German television series debuts
1984 German television series endings
German television shows featuring puppetry
German-language television shows
ZDF original programming
Grimme-Preis for fiction winners